Cichus is a lunar impact crater that lies in the southwestern part of the Moon, at the eastern edge of Palus Epidemiarum. Just to the northeast and nearly contacting the rim is the lava-flooded crater remnant Weiss. The crater is named after Italian astronomer Cecco d'Ascoli.

The rim of this crater is only slightly worn, although the crater Cichus C lies across the southwestern rim. Sections of the inner wall are terraced, and the western side is somewhat wider than in the east. Several small ridges lie across the interior floor. A ray from the bright crater Tycho to the southeast passes tangentially just to the northeast of the rim.

Satellite craters

By convention these features are identified on lunar maps by placing the letter on the side of the crater midpoint that is closest to Cichus.

References

 
 
 
 
 
 
 
 
 
 
 

Impact craters on the Moon